The Victoria is a Grade II listed public house  in  Richmond, in the London Borough of Richmond upon Thames. It is in an 18th-century terrace at 78 Hill Rise on Richmond Hill.

References

Commercial buildings completed in the 18th century
Grade II listed buildings in the London Borough of Richmond upon Thames
Grade II listed pubs in London
Pubs in the London Borough of Richmond upon Thames
Richmond, London